The Stanford Harmonics are a co-ed a cappella group from Stanford University. Known for their alternative rock repertoire and award-winning recordings, the Harmonics have garnered international recognition for their performances and have been featured on BOCA, Sing, and Voices Only a cappella compilations. The Harmonics are one of the few collegiate a cappella groups that own their own wireless microphone equipment and have developed a live performance style that includes the use of electronic distortion and sound effects.

History 

The group's third release, Insanity Laughs (1999), was received as a "breakthrough album" for the unprecedented mixing of its drum-like vocal percussion.

In 2009, their landmark studio album, Escape Velocity, won three Contemporary A Cappella Recording Awards, including Best Mixed Collegiate Album, and was selected by the Recorded A Cappella Review Board as one of their Picks of the Decade.

In 2010, the Harmonics won the A Cappella Community Awards for Favorite Mixed Collegiate Group and Favorite Scholastic Album.

In 2020, the album "Signal Lost" by the Harmonics won Best Rock Album from the Contemporary A Cappella Recording Awards

Recordings 

The Stanford Harmonics have released ten full-length albums, one "greatest hits" album, and one extended play, alongside numerous singles.

 The Greatest Hits of Pitchpipe (1995)
 Escalator Music (1997)
 Insanity Laughs  (1999)
 Phonoshop (2001)
 evolut10n (2002) - 10 Year Anniversary "Greatest Hits" Album
 Rock Beats Scissors (2003)
 Shadowplay (2005)
 Escape Velocity (2008)
 Midnight Hour (2013)
 The Messes of Men (2015) - EP
 Fault of Imagination (2017)
 Signal Lost (2019)

Awards and nominations 

|-
| 1998
| Contemporary A Cappella Recording Awards
| Best Mixed Collegiate Album
| Escalator Music
| 
| 
|-
| rowspan="2" | 2000
| rowspan="2" | Contemporary A Cappella Recording Awards
| Best Mixed Collegiate Album
| Insanity Laughs
| 
| rowspan="2" | 
|-
| Best Mixed Collegiate Arrangement
| Jonathan Pilat
| 
|-
| rowspan="2" | 2002
| rowspan="2" | Contemporary A Cappella Recording Awards
| Best Mixed Collegiate Album
| Phonoshop
| 
| 
|-
| Best Mixed Collegiate Arrangement
| Jonathan Pilat for "We Are In Love"
| style="background: #F4F2B0" | 
| 
|-
| 2004
| Contemporary A Cappella Recording Awards
| Best Mixed Collegiate Song
| "Lady Marmalade" from Rock Beats Scissors
| style="background: #F4F2B0" | 
| 
|-
| rowspan="2" | 2006
| rowspan="2" | Contemporary A Cappella Recording Awards
| Best Mixed Collegiate Album
| Shadowplay
| 
| rowspan="2" | 
|-
| Best Mixed Collegiate Solo
| Bryan Tan for "The Memory Remains"
| 
|-
| rowspan="4" | 2009
| rowspan="4" | Contemporary A Cappella Recording Awards
| Best Mixed Collegiate Album
| Escape Velocity
| 
| rowspan="4" | 
|-
| Best Mixed Collegiate Song
| "The Sound of Silence"
| 
|-
| rowspan="2" | Best Mixed Collegiate Arrangement
| Charlie Forkish for "The Sound of Silence"
| 
|-
| Charlie Forkish for "Imagination"
| style="background: #F4F2B0" | 

|-
| 2010
| Contemporary A Cappella Recording Awards
| Best Mixed Collegiate Song
| "Spiel Met Mir" from Sing Six: Sunny Side Up
| 
| 
|-
| rowspan="3" | 2014
| rowspan="3" | Contemporary A Cappella Recording Awards
| Best Mixed Collegiate Album
| Midnight Hour
| 
| rowspan="3" | 
|-
| Best Mixed Collegiate Song
| "Somebody to Love"
| 
|-
| Best Mixed Collegiate Arrangement
| Evan Smith for "Somebody to Love"
| 
|-
| 2018
| Contemporary A Cappella Recording Awards
| Best Electronic / Experimental Album
| Fault of Imagination
| 
| 
|-
| rowspan="3" | 2020
| rowspan="3" | Contemporary A Cappella Recording Awards
| Best Rock Album
| Signal Lost
| 
| rowspan="1" | 
|-
| Best Rock Song
| "Zombie" from Signal Lost
| 
| rowspan="2" | 
|-
| Best Mixed Collegiate Album
| Signal Lost
| 
|-
| 2022
| Contemporary A Cappella Recording Awards
| Best Mixed Voices Collegiate Solo
| Mitchell Zimmerman for "Ever After" (Single)
| 
| 
|-
| 2022
| Best of College A Cappella
| Featured Single ‘Bad Liar’
| Single
|  
|

ICCA results 

The International Championship of Collegiate A Cappella (ICCA) first judged live a cappella performance competitions in 1996.

Notable members 

 Singer/songwriter Vienna Teng
 Contemporary A Cappella Society of America (CASA) President Julia Hoffman and Board Member Ariel Glassman
 Hookslide singers Jon Pilat and George Hoffman
 Former Skritch lead Bryan Tan
 Icon Parthiv Krishna 
 Gautam Raghavan, Deputy Director of the White House Presidential Personnel Office

See also

List of Stanford University a cappella groups

References

External links
Official Website

Collegiate a cappella groups
Harmonics